Coombe Boys' School and Sixth Form is a non-selective state secondary school with a mixed sixth form in New Malden, Royal Borough of Kingston upon Thames, England. The cohort comprises boys from Years 7 to 11 and a joint sixth form facility is offered for Year 12 and 13 students. The school was founded in 1931 (as Beverley Central School) and celebrated its 90th Anniversary in 2021. In 2006, the school federated with Coombe Girls' School and Sixth Form forming part of the Coombe Academy Trust and has a long-standing educational partnership with the independent King's College School, Wimbledon. Coombe Boys' School is part of the Kingston Teaching School Alliance, a partnership of over twenty schools, Achieving for Children (AfC) and two higher education institutions; the UCL Institute of Education (University of London) and the University of Roehampton.

In February 2023, it was announced that large parts of the school buildings are to be demolished and replaced in a major re-building programme.

Results and achievements 
The school was inspected by Ofsted in December 2013 and again, in a short inspection, in March 2018.  The overall inspection rating for Coombe Boys' School on both occasions was 'Good with Outstanding Features'. In 2013, the school was rated 'Outstanding' for Leadership and Management and 'Good' in 'Achievement of Pupils', the 'Quality of Teaching' and the 'Behaviour and Safety of Pupils'.

In 2018, Ofsted commented that: "The latest GCSE results show that the school has maintained above-average attainment in English and mathematics" and: "In the sixth form, vocational results are exceptionally strong."  The report also found that: "Warm, positive relationships have created a supportive environment in which pupils feel confident to ask questions and push themselves further".

In 2020, Coombe Boys' Drama Department was awarded the first 'National Outstanding School Drama Department' at the Music & Drama Education Awards. Judges remarked that the Coombe Boys' Drama Team were "An exemplary department which goes above and beyond in the pursuit of excellence in drama provision".

Sport 
Sports offered include football, table tennis, badminton, rugby, basketball, athletics and cricket with links to the local Malden Wanderers Cricket Club. The school's sporting achievements include the Surrey basketball finals, Surrey football finals, national badminton finals and winning the English Schools' Football Association PlayStation F.C. Schools' Cup two years running in 2014 and 2015.

CAPA – Performing Arts 
In 2019 the Coombe Academy Trust launched CAPA, the Coombe Academy of Performing Arts, which is based at the Coombe Boys' school site. It provides out of hours tuition available to boys and girls (aged 9 upwards) from the local community.

Notable alumni 

 Cyril Barton VC — RAF bomber pilot, posthumously awarded the Victoria Cross for his actions in World War II
 Sqn Leader Ian Bazalgette VC DFC — posthumously awarded the Victoria Cross for bravery in World War II; great-grandson of Sir Joseph Bazalgette
 Ryan Sessegnon — footballer for Tottenham Hotspur
 Steven Sessegnon — footballer for Fulham FC
 Harvey Elliott — footballer for Liverpool FC
 Fabio Carvalho — footballer for Liverpool FC
 Matthew Pennycook — MP for Greenwich and Woolwich
 Peter Meineck — artistic director of Aquila Theatre and Clinical Associate Professor of Classics at New York University

Headteachers 

 2015 – present: David Smith
 2012 – 2015: Deborah Walls
 2006 – 2012: Carol Campbell 
 2000 – 2006: Paul Templeman-Wright
 1960 – 1985: Clifford Fisher
 1954 - 1960: Mr. Dewbert
 1948 - 1954: W.R. Heale
 1931 - 1948: Mr. Thorpe

References

External links 
 

Boys' schools in London
Academies in the Royal Borough of Kingston upon Thames
Educational institutions established in 1931
Secondary schools in the Royal Borough of Kingston upon Thames
New Malden
1931 establishments in England